Séguélon Department is a department of Kabadougou Region in Denguélé District, Ivory Coast. In 2021, its population was 33,585 and its seat is the settlement of Séguélon. The sub-prefectures of the department are Gbongaha and Séguélon.

History
Séguélon Department was created in 2012 by dividing Madinani Department.

Notes

States and territories established in 2012
2012 establishments in Ivory Coast
Departments of Kabadougou